Homoaconitase may refer to:

 Homoaconitate hydratase
 Methanogen homoaconitase